Eryx elegans (Central Asian sand boa, elegant sand boa) is a boa species endemic to western Central Asia. Like all other boas, it is not venomous. No subspecies are recognized.

Description
Not well-known in the wild or in captivity, this is a small species, reaching about 15 inches (38 cm) in total length (including tail). The dorsal scales are small and slightly keeled.  Coloration is very drab, consisting of a light olive-brown background, with small, irregular, darker brown blotches with black edges running along the back.  There are also brown blotches on the ventral surface.

Geographic range
Eryx elegans is found in southern Turkmenistan, northern Iran (the Kopet Dag mountains in the north-east and the Azerbaijan region in the north-west), and Afghanistan. The type locality given is "Afghanistan."

References

Further reading
Boulenger GA. 1893. Catalogue of the Snakes in the British Museum (Natural History). Volume I., Containing the Families ... Boidæ ... London: Trustees of the British Museum (Natural History). (Taylor and Francis, printers). xiii + 448 pp. + Plates I-XXVIII. (Eryx elegans, p. 128 + Plate V, Figure 1).
Gray JE. 1849. Catalogue of the Specimens of Snakes in the Collection of the British Museum. London: Trustees of the British Museum. (Edward Newman, printer). xv + 125 pp. (Cusoria elegans, new species, p. 107).
Günther ACLG. 1864. The Reptiles of British India. London: The Ray Society. (Taylor and Francis, printers). xxvii + 452 pp. + Plates I-XXVI. (Cursoria elegans, pp. 333–334).
Latifi, Mahmoud. 1991. Snakes of Iran. Oxford, Ohio: Society for the Study of Amphibians and Reptiles. 167 pp. . (Eryx elegans, p. 96 + Plate 11, Figure 23).

External links
 

elegans
Reptiles of Central Asia
Reptiles of Azerbaijan
Reptiles described in 1849
Taxa named by John Edward Gray